Clann Cosgraigh or Clann Coscraig was a branch of the Uí Briúin Seóla dynasty and also the name of the district on the eastern side of Lough Corrib, County Galway which they inhabited and ruled prior to the Norman invasion. 

Its chiefs were the Meic Áeda (now rendered McHugh or McGagh, via Mac Aodha), who, like the Muintir Murchada, claimed descent from Cenn Fáelad mac Colgan, King of Connacht.  Early generations of the lineage competed with the Muintir Murchada and Uí Fiachrach Aidhne for the kingship of South Connacht. 

In 1124 Muireadhach (i.e. lord of Clann-Coscraigh), the son of Aedh, son of Ruaidhri, died an ecclesiastic.

In 1170, Ruaidhri Mac Aedha, lord of Clann-Cosgraigh, died on his pilgrimage at Tuaim-da-ghualann.

See also

 Donn mac Cumasgach
 Ruaidhrí mac Coscraigh

References

 Medieval Ireland: Territorial, Political and Economic Divisions, Paul MacCotter, Four Courts Press, 2008. 
 http://www.rootsweb.ancestry.com/~irlkik/ihm/connacht.htm#aid

History of County Galway
Gaelic-Irish nations and dynasties
Irish families